Same-sex marriage in Spain has been legal since July 3, 2005. In 2004, the nation's newly elected government, led by Prime Minister José Luis Rodríguez Zapatero of the Socialist Workers' Party, began a campaign to legalize same-sex marriage, including the right of adoption by same-sex couples. After much debate, a law permitting same-sex marriage was passed by the Cortes Generales (the Spanish Parliament, composed of the Senate and the Congress of Deputies) by a vote of 187–147 on June 30, 2005, and published on July 2. The law took effect the next day, making Spain the third country in the world to allow same-sex couples to marry on a national level, after the Netherlands and Belgium, and 17 days ahead of the right being extended across all of Canada.

Roman Catholic authorities were adamantly opposed, criticising what they regarded as the weakening of the meaning of marriage, despite support from 66% of the population. Other associations expressed concern over the possibility of lesbian and gay couples adopting children. After its approval, the conservative People's Party challenged the law in the Constitutional Court.

Approximately 4,500 same-sex couples married in Spain during the first year of the law. Shortly after the law was passed, questions arose about the legal status of marriage to non-Spaniards whose country did not permit same-sex marriage. A decision from the Justice Ministry stated that the country's same-sex marriage law allows a Spanish citizen to marry a non-Spaniard regardless of whether that person's homeland recognizes the union. At least one partner must be a Spanish citizen in order to marry, although two non-Spaniards may marry if they both have legal residence in Spain.

The November 2011 general election delivered a landslide victory to the People's Party, whose leader Mariano Rajoy said he opposed same-sex marriage, but any decision about repealing the law would be made only after the ruling of the Constitutional Court. On November 6, 2012, the law was upheld by the court with 8 support votes and 3 against. Minister of Justice Alberto Ruiz-Gallardón announced that the government will abide by the ruling and the law will not be repealed.

History

The first law recognising cohabiting same-sex couples was passed in 1994 for the purpose of providing limited legal rights with regards to renting. During the 1990s and early 2000s, several city councils and autonomous communities opened registries for de facto unions (pareja de hecho or pareja estable) that allow benefits for unmarried couples of any sex, although the effect is mainly symbolic. Registries were eventually created in all 17 of Spain's autonomous communities; in Catalonia (1998), Aragon (1999), Navarre (2000), Castile-La Mancha (2000), Valencia (2001), the Balearic Islands (2001), Madrid (2001), Asturias (2002), Castile and León (2002), Andalusia (2002), the Canary Islands (2003), Extremadura (2003), the Basque Country (2003), Cantabria (2005), Galicia (2008), La Rioja (2010), and Murcia (2018), and in both autonomous cities; Ceuta (1998) and Melilla (2008). Spanish law already allowed single people to adopt children; thus, a same-sex couple could undertake a de facto adoption, but the partner who was not the legal parent had no rights if the relationship ended or if the legal parent died. Same-sex marriages were not legal in the autonomous communities, because the Spanish Constitution gives the State the sole power to legislate marriage.

The Socialist Workers' Party (PSOE) manifesto for the 2004 general election included the pledge of amending the Civil Code to introduce same-sex marriage, granting it the same status as heterosexual marriage in order to "ensure full social and legal equality for lesbians and gays". After the Socialists' victory in the election, Prime Minister José Luis Rodríguez Zapatero promised at his inauguration address to bring this change forward: "The moment has finally arrived to end once and for all the intolerable discrimination which many Spaniards suffer because of their sexual preferences. ... As a result, we will modify the Civil Code to recognize their equal right to marriage with the resulting effects over inheritance, labor rights and social security protection". On June 30, 2004, Minister of Justice Juan Fernando López Aguilar announced that the Congress of Deputies had provisionally approved a government plan for legislation to extend the right of marriage to same-sex couples. López Aguilar also announced two propositions, introduced by the regional Convergence and Union party of Catalonia: one would introduce legal status for both opposite-sex and same-sex common-law unions (parejas de hecho, "de facto unions"), while the other would permit transgender people to legally change their name and sex designation without the requirement of surgery. The bill regarding same-sex marriage was approved by the Council of Ministers on October 1, 2004, submitted to Parliament on December 31, and passed by the Congress of Deputies on April 21, 2005. However, it was rejected on June 22, 2005 by the Senate, where the opposition People's Party held a plurality of the seats. The bill was returned to the lower house, which holds the power to override the Senate, and final approval was given to the bill on June 30, 2005, with 187 "yes" votes, 147 "no" votes, and 4 abstentions.

With the final approval and enactment of the bill on July 2, 2005, Spain became the third country in the world to formally legalize same-sex marriages nationwide, after the Netherlands and Belgium. The first same-sex wedding took place eight days after the bill became law, and was performed in the council chamber in the Madrid suburb of Tres Cantos between Carlos Baturín and Emilio Menéndez. The first same-sex marriage between women took place in Barcelona eleven days later. In the Basque Country, the first marriage for a male couple was performed in Vitoria-Gasteiz, and the first marriage for a lesbian couple occurred in Errenteria.

In spite of these steps toward equal treatment, a legal flaw remained: if children were born within a lesbian marriage, the non-biological mother was not legally regarded as a parent; she still had to undergo the lengthy financial process of adoption. This right was granted to heterosexual couples (married or not), where a stepfather could declare his wife's children to be his without further process. On November 7, 2006, the Spanish Parliament amended the law on assisted reproduction, allowing the non-biological mother to be regarded as a parent alongside her female spouse who is the birth-mother.

Ratification of Law 13/2005

The projected bill announced on June 30, 2004 by the Minister of Justice was studied by the General Council of the Judiciary. Although the General Council admitted that the existing discrimination against homosexuals could not be condoned, it was quite critical about extending marriage toward same-sex couples (including collateral adoption). It argued that the extension was not demanded by the Constitution, and that ending discrimination could be achieved through other legal means, such as the extension of civil unions.

Despite this negative report, the Zapatero Government presented the bill to Congress on October 1, 2004. With the exception of the People's Party and members of the Democratic Union of Catalonia, the different parliamentary parties favoured the reform. On April 21, 2005, Congress approved the bill, with 183 "yes" votes (including a member of the People's Party) and 136 "no" votes and 6 abstentions. The bill to allow same-sex marriage in Spain was short: it added a new paragraph to Article 44 of the Civil Code, saying that Matrimony shall have the same requisites and effects regardless of whether the persons involved are of the same or different sex.

In accordance with constitutional provisions, the text approved by the Congress was then submitted to the Senate for final approval, change or veto. On June 21, 2005, experts were called to the Senate to debate the issue. The expert's opinions were diverse; some stated that same-sex adoption had no effect on a child's development, except for perhaps a higher tolerance towards homosexuality. However, psychiatrist Aquilino Polaino, called by the People's Party as an expert, called homosexuality a pathology and emotive disorder. Among other assertions that generated debate, he claimed that "many homosexuals have rape abuse antecedents since childhood" and that homosexuals generally come from families with "hostile, alcoholic and distant" fathers, and mothers who were "over protective" toward boys and "cold" toward girls. Prominent People's Party members later rejected Polaino's assertions.

The Senate vetoed the text submitted by the Congress. The veto was proposed by the People's Party, which held the plurality of the seats, and by the Democratic Union of Catalonia, and was approved by 131 "yes" votes and 119 "no" votes and 2 abstentions. As a result, the text was sent back to the Congress. On June 30, 2005, it was approved by Congress, which, in accordance with constitutional provisions, overrode the Senate veto. This was achieved with 187 "yes" votes (including a member of the People's Party, Celia Villalobos), 147 "no" votes, and four abstentions. The veto override implied its approval as law. The vote was held after Zapatero unexpectedly took the floor to speak in its support, saying "We are expanding the opportunities for happiness of our neighbors, our colleagues, our friends and our relatives. At the same time, we are building a more decent society." Mariano Rajoy, the leader of the opposition People's Party, was denied the opportunity to address Congress after Zapatero's appearance, and accused Zapatero of dividing Spanish society.

When the media asked King Juan Carlos I if he would sign the bill that was being debated in the Cortes Generales, he answered that he was the King of Spain, not of Belgiuma reference to King Baudouin of Belgium, who refused to sign the Belgian law legalising abortion. For the King to withhold his royal assent, it would effect a veto of the legislation. However, the King gave his royal assent to the law on July 1, 2005, and the law was gazetted in the Boletín Oficial del Estado on July 2, and came into effect on July 3. The King received criticism by Carlist and other far-right conservatives for signing the legislation.

Reactions

The bill's passage was met with concern by Catholic authorities, including Pope John Paul II—who warned of a weakening of family values—and his successor Pope Benedict XVI. Cardinal López Trujillo, president of the Pontifical Council for the Family, said the Church was making an urgent call for freedom of conscience for Catholics and appealing to them to resist the law. He said every profession linked with implementing same-sex marriages should oppose it, even if it meant losing their jobs. Gay rights supporters argued that while the Catholic Church also formally opposed opposite-sex, non-religious marriage, its opposition was not as vocal; for example, the Church did not object to the marriage of Prince Felipe to Letizia Ortiz, who had divorced from a previous civil marriage. The church was unable to gather enough support to derail the bill, even though more than 60% of Spaniards identify as members of the Catholic faith. Sociologists believe this may be due to the significant increase of liberalism in the realm of individual rights in recent years, where the Church traditionally had most influence, especially on family issues. A poll showed that three quarters of Spaniards believed the church hierarchy was out of touch with social reality. A complementary explanation might be that the Church's influence on Spaniards declined after the death in 1975 of the dictator, General Francisco Franco, whose regime was closely linked to the Church.

Prime Minister Zapatero responded to Church criticism by saying:

On June 19, 2005, a public protest against the law was held. Protesters—led by People's Party members, Spanish bishops and the Spanish Family Forum (Foro Español de la Familia)—said they had rallied 1.5 million people against what they considered an attack on the traditional family and Spanish values; the Government Delegation in Madrid counted 166,000 at the same event. Two weeks after this protest, coinciding with Gay Pride Day, FELGT (Federación Estatal de Lesbianas, Gays, Transexuales y Bisexuales, the "National Federation of Lesbians, Gays, Transsexuals and Bisexuals") estimated two million people marched in favour of the new law; police sources counted 97,000. Both marches took place in Madrid, at the time governed by the conservative People's Party.

Spanish Roman Catholic bishops also claimed that the government, by extending the right of marriage to same-sex couples, weakened the meaning of marriage, which they defined as the union of a heterosexual couple. The Spanish Family Forum expressed concern over the possibility of same-sex couples adopting and raising children, and argued that adoption is not a right for the parents, but for the adopted. Gay associations replied that de facto adoption by same-sex couples had existed for a long time in Spain, since many couples were already rearing minors adopted by one of the partners. Joint adoption by same-sex couples was already legal in Navarre (2000), the Basque Country (2003), Aragon (2004), Catalonia (2005) and Cantabria (2005) before the same-sex marriage law legalized it nationwide. In addition, in Asturias (2002), Andalusia (2002) and Extremadura (2003), same-sex couples could jointly begin procedures to temporarily or permanently take children in care. These associations also argued that there was no scientific basis for the claim that the parents' sexual orientation would cause developmental problems for their adopted children. This view is officially supported by the Spanish School of Psychology, which also states that homosexuality is not a pathology.

In a 2008 biography, Queen Sofía of Spain revealed that she preferred the term "civil union" to "marriage" for committed same-sex relationships. This and other alleged comments by the Queen opened the Spanish monarchy to rare criticism in 2008, with the Zarzuela Palace issuing an apology on behalf of the Queen for the "inexact" quotes attributed to her. Antonio Poveda, president of FELGT, said his organization accepted the Queen's apology, but added that there remains ill feelings by the gay community towards the Queen over the comments. King Juan Carlos, known to be far more liberal than his wife, was reportedly incensed by the biography, with reporters stating the King will fire palace officials who allegedly approved official royal endorsement of the book. During the 2011 general election, People's Party leader Mariano Rajoy said he also preferred the term "civil union" to marriage for same-sex couples.

In late 2017, the Socialist Workers' Party began calling for reforms to the Spanish Constitution to explicitly state the right of all couples, opposite-sex and same-sex, to marry. At present, the Constitution, specifically Article 32, notes the right of men and women to marry.

Opposition court challenges
On July 21, 2005, a judge from the city of Dénia, Valencia refused to issue a marriage license to a lesbian couple. The judge filed a challenge against the same-sex marriage law with the Constitutional Court based on Article 163 of the Constitution, which allows judges to challenge constitutional changes. In August 2005, a judge from Gran Canaria refused licenses to three same-sex couples and mounted another constitutional challenge. In December 2005, the Constitutional Court rejected both challenges owing to both judges' lack of standing to file them. On September 30, 2005, the opposition People's Party decided to initiate a separate constitutional challenge, causing division within the party. The outcome was published on November 6, 2012, seven years after the challenge was presented. The court decided to uphold the same-sex marriage law with 8 support votes and 3 against.

On February 27, 2007, the Spanish Family Forum presented an initiative signed by 1.5 million people to legislate marriage as the union of a man and a woman only (thus effectively prohibiting same-sex marriage). The initiative was rejected by the Spanish Congress. On May 30, 2007, the aforementioned judge of Dénia was condemned by the Disciplinary Committee of the General Council of the Judiciary to pay €305 for refusing to marry the couple and was also strictly warned against doing it again. She attributed this action to government "propagandistic machinery".

Residency issues
Shortly after the law was passed, questions arose about the legal status of marriage to non-Spaniards, after a Spaniard and an Indian national living in Catalonia were denied a marriage license on the grounds that India did not permit same-sex marriage. However, on July 22, another judge in Catalonia married a Spanish woman and her Argentinian partner (the first same-sex marriage between women in Spain). This judge disagreed with his colleague's decision and gave preference to the right of marriage over Argentinian law, which at the time did not allow same-sex marriage.

On July 27, the Junta de Fiscales de Sala – a body within the Public Prosecutor's Office that advises the Ministry of Justice – issued an opinion that LGBT Spaniards can marry foreigners from countries that do not permit same-sex marriage. These marriages would be valid according to Spanish law, but did not imply automatic validity according to the foreigner's national law. A ruling published in the Boletín Oficial del Estado stated:

According to the instructions from the Ministry of Justice, Spanish consulates abroad may carry out the preliminary paperwork for a same-sex marriage. At least one of the marrying partners must be a Spanish citizen, residing in the consular demarcation. However, the marriage itself can only take place at the consulate if local laws recognize same-sex marriages. In all other cases, the partners must marry in Spanish territory. Two non-resident foreigners cannot marry in Spain, as at least one of the partners must be a Spanish resident, although they both may be non-Spanish citizens.

Marriage statistics
According to the Spanish National Statistics Institute (INE), more than 62,000 same-sex marriages took place up to the end of 2021: 1,269 in 2005, 4,313 in 2006, 3,193 in 2007, 3,149 in 2008, 3,082 in 2009, 3,193 in 2010, 3,540 in 2011, 3,455 in 2012, 3,071 in 2013, 3,275 in 2014, 3,738 in 2015, 4,320 in 2016, 4,637 in 2017, 4,870 in 2018, 5,108 in 2019, 3,112 in 2020, and 5,035 in 2021.

Most same-sex marriages in 2018 were performed in Catalonia at 987, followed by Madrid at 956, Andalusia at 774, Valencia at 589, the Canary Islands at 333, the Balearic Islands at 194, the Basque Country at 191, Murcia at 145, Castilla-La Mancha at 135, Galicia at 124, Castile and León at 92, Aragon at 68, Extremadura at 66, Asturias and Navarre at 50 each, Cantabria at 41, La Rioja at 24, Melilla at 7 and Ceuta at 2. Another 42 were performed abroad in Spanish consulates.

Figures for 2020 are much lower than previous years because of the restrictions in place due to the COVID-19 pandemic.

Notable weddings
A same-sex marriage between two men, Pedro Díaz and Muño Vandilaz, occurred in Rairiz de Veiga on 16 April 1061. They were married by a priest at a small chapel. The historic documents about the church wedding were found at Monastery of San Salvador de Celanova.

Although not an official same-sex marriage, in 1901 Marcela Gracia Ibeas and Elisa Sanchez Loriga married at the Igrexa de San Xurxo in A Coruña by Elisa secretly being re-baptized as a man.

Since its legalization in 2005, couples from across sections of Spanish society have entered into same-sex marriages. Within the first year the law received royal assent, Pedro Zerolo,  influential Socialist member of the Madrid City Council, married Jesús Santos in October, and popular television presenter Jesús Vázquez married Roberto Cortés in November. In October 2005, Spain's prominent anti-terrorism judge Fernando Grande-Marlaska married his fiancé Gorka Gómez. In August 2006, Ourense City Councilor Pepe Araujo, whose party originally opposed the law, married his fiancé Nino Crespo. In September 2006, Alberto Linero Marchena and Alberto Sánchez Fernández, both army soldiers assigned to the Morón Air Base near Seville, became Spain's first military personnel to marry under the new law. In August 2008, Doña Luisa Isabel Álvarez de Toledo, 21st Duchess of Medina Sidonia and three-time Grandee of Spain (branded the Red Duchess for her socialist activism) became the highest ranking Spanish noble to marry in an articulo mortis (deathbed) wedding to longtime companion Liliana Maria Dahlmann, now the Dowager Duchess of Medina Sidonia by right of her late wife.

In June 2015, Mayor Javier Maroto of the Basque capital of Vitoria-Gasteiz announced his engagement to longtime partner Josema Rodríguez. The wedding was held on September 18, 2015 at Vitoria-Gasteiz City Hall. Maroto, a member of the conservative People's Party's national board, is known for his views contrary to the stance of his own party pertaining to same-sex marriage in Spain. Prime Minister Mariano Rajoy, who had challenged the law approving same-sex marriage when he was opposition leader, attended the wedding celebrations as a guest.

Religious performance
Marriage in Spain may be contracted by religious or civil authorities. Religious marriages are recognised by the State and have the same status as civil marriages.

Most major Christian denominations in Spain do not perform same-sex marriages in their places of worship. Some small Christian churches such as the Metropolitan Community Church perform blessings of same-sex marriages. The Spanish Evangelical Church (IEE) adopted a resolution in 2015 calling for the acceptance of same-sex unions. The move was widely criticised by the Federation of Evangelical Religious Entities of Spain, of which the IEE is a member, which chose to maintain the IEE as a member while also adopting a motion preventing any church supporting same-sex unions to be admitted as a member in the future.

Public opinion
A poll by the government-run Centre for Sociological Investigations (Centro de Investigaciones Sociológicas), published in April 2005, reported that 66% of Spaniards favoured legalising same-sex marriage. Another poll taken by Instituto Opina a day before the bill passed placed support for the same-sex marriage bill at 62.1% and support of adoption by same-sex couples at 49.1%. An Instituto Opina poll taken nine months after the bill had passed showed that 61% agreed with the legalization.

On July 25, 2007, the BBVA Foundation published their report Social portrait of Spanish people, which showed that 60% of Spain's population supported same-sex marriage. This support occurred mainly among the younger population, between 15 and 34 years old (75%), people with higher education (71%), people not attached to any religion (75.5%), and those identified by left and centre-left political views (71.9%). However, only 44% of the population favored the right of adoption by same-sex couples, in contrast to 42% opposition.

A May 2013 Ipsos poll found that 76% of respondents were in favour of same-sex marriage and another 13% supported other forms of recognition for same-sex couples. According to an Ifop poll conducted that same month, 71% of Spaniards supported allowing same-sex couples to marry and adopt children.

The 2015 Eurobarometer found that 84% of Spaniards thought same-sex marriage should be allowed throughout Europe, while 10% were opposed.

A Pew Research Center poll, conducted between April and August 2017 and published in May 2018, showed that 77% of Spaniards supported same-sex marriage, 13% were opposed and 10% did not know or refused to answer. When divided by religion, 90% of religiously unaffiliated people, 79% of non-practicing Christians and 59% of church-attending Christians supported same-sex marriage. Opposition was 7% among 18–34-year-olds.

The 2019 Eurobarometer found that 86% of Spaniards thought same-sex marriage should be allowed throughout Europe, while 9% were opposed.

See also
 First same-sex marriage in Spain
 LGBT rights by country
 LGBT rights in Spain
 Recognition of same-sex unions in Europe

Notes

References

External links

 Same-Sex Marriage: A Selective Bibliography of the Legal Literature (includes Spanish case)

Marriage in Spain
2005 in Spain
LGBT history in Spain
LGBT rights in Spain
Spain
2005 in LGBT history
Articles containing video clips